The Round Top Festival Institute is a musical institute established in 1971 by pianist James Dick in Round Top, Texas. It provides musical education programs in summer months, and hosts several concerts every year.

References

External links 
 http://www.festivalhill.org

Texas classical music
Education in Fayette County, Texas
Tourist attractions in Fayette County, Texas
Music venues in Texas
1971 establishments in Texas